Faxonius erichsonianus  is a species in the family Cambaridae ("crayfishes"), in the order Decapoda ("crabs, crayfishes, lobsters, prawns, and shrimp"). A common name for Faxonius erichsonianus is Reticulate Crayfish.
Faxonius erichsonianus is found in the south eastern United States of America.

The IUCN conservation status of Faxonius erichsonianus is "LC", least concern, with no immediate threat to the species' survival.

References

 Williams, Austin B., Lawrence G. Abele, D. L. Felder, H. H. Hobbs Jr., R. B. Manning, et al. (1989). Common and Scientific Names of Aquatic Invertebrates from the United States and Canada: Decapod Crustaceans. American Fisheries Society Special Publication 17, 77.
 Hobbs Jr., Horton H. (1989). An Illustrated Checklist of the American Crayfishes (Decapoda: Astacidae, Cambaridae, and Parastacidae). Smithsonian Contributions to Zoology, no. 480, iii + 236.

External links
NCBI Taxonomy Browser, Orconectes erichsonianus

Cambaridae
Crustaceans described in 1898
Taxa named by Walter Faxon
Taxobox trinomials not recognized by IUCN 
Taxobox binomials not recognized by IUCN